Betzy Del Carmen Madrid, is a Panamanian model and a pageant titleholder from Ciudad de Panamá, Panamá who represented the Panamá Centro state in the Bellezas Panamá 2013 pageant, on August 9, 2013, and won the title of Miss Panamá International 2013.

References

External links
 Bellezas Panamá official website

1994 births
Living people
Señorita Panamá
Panamanian beauty pageant winners
Miss International 2013 delegates